MMSc may refer to:

 Master of Medical Science
 Multimedia Messaging Service